Paula Yamila Nizetich (born 27 January 1989) is an Argentine volleyball player who plays for Greek club AEK Athens in the A1 Ethniki and is a member of the Argentina national team. She competed at the 2016 and 2020 Summer Olympics.

Career
She participated at the Pan-American Volleyball Cup (in 2006, 2007, 2008, 2009, 2010, 2011, 2013, 2014, 2015, 2016), the FIVB Volleyball World Grand Prix (in 2011, 2012, 2013, 2014, 2015, 2016), the 2011 FIVB Volleyball Women's World Cup in Japan, the 2014 FIVB Volleyball Women's World Championship in Italy, the 2015 Pan American Games in Canada and two Olympic Games, 2016 in Brazil and 2020 in Japan.

At club level she played for Banco Nación, Olimpico Freyre, Ícaro Palma, Paris Saint Cloud, Rote Raben, SES Calais, Beşiktaş, Nilüfer and since 2015 plays for Seramiksan. She was selected to play the Italian League All-Star game in 2017.

Clubs
  Banco Nación Córdoba (2000–2004)
  Olimpico Freyre (2004–2007)
  Ícaro Palma (2007–2008)
  SF Paris Saint Cloud (2008–2009)
  Rote Raben Vilsbiburg (2009–2010)
  Stella Étoile Sportive Calais (2010–2013)
  Beşiktaş (2013–2014)
  Nilüfer Belediyespor (2014–2015)
  Seramiksan SK (2015–2017)
  Volley Pesaro (2017–2018)
  Igor Gorgonzola Novara (2018–2019)
  Bosca S. Bernardo Cuneo Volley (2019-   )

References

External links
 Profile at CEV
 Profile  at Ligue Nationale de Volley (LNV)

1989 births
Living people
Argentine women's volleyball players
Sportspeople from Córdoba, Argentina
Volleyball players at the 2015 Pan American Games
Olympic volleyball players of Argentina
Volleyball players at the 2016 Summer Olympics
Wing spikers
Pan American Games medalists in volleyball
Pan American Games bronze medalists for Argentina
Medalists at the 2019 Pan American Games
Volleyball players at the 2020 Summer Olympics
21st-century Argentine women